Kumar Krishnan is a Singaporean football goalkeeper who played for Singapore in the 1984 Asian Cup.

Club career 
Kumar first signed for Tampines Rovers FC in 1981.

He then signed for Singapore Armed Forces Sports Association (SAFSA) in 1982.

International career 
Kumar was called up to the national team in 1981.

Coaching career 
After retirement from competitive football, Kumar became a goalkeeper coach.

References

Stats

Year of birth missing (living people)
Living people
Singaporean footballers
Singapore international footballers
1984 AFC Asian Cup players
Association football goalkeepers
Place of birth missing (living people)
Singaporean people of Tamil descent
Singaporean sportspeople of Indian descent